Phir Teri Kahani Yaad Aayee is an Indian 90's melodious musical Hindi-language romance film. It was produced by Jonny Bakshi and Nitin Keni, directed by Mahesh Bhatt, and starred Pooja Bhatt and Rahul Roy. The Film premiered on Zee TV on 30 July 1993.

Plot

An alcoholic movie director, Rahul (Rahul Roy) ends up in a Rehabilitation Centre. Once there, he finds out that there is an inmate, Pooja (Pooja Bhatt),  who is schizophrenic and has deep ranging mental problems. After an initial clash of personalities, the two become fast friends, and find that they are in love with each other. But Pooja's paranoia and instability makes any relationship impossible, and as a result she is hospitalized in a mental institution. Shortly thereafter, there is a fire at the institution, and Pooja is killed in it. Rahul is devastated by Pooja's death, and is unable to take her off of his mind. One of his movie actresses, Seema (Pooja Bedi), and his brother Rohit, attempt to divert his mind, without much success. Then Rahul starts getting phone calls from a girl whose voice resembles Pooja's. Near the end it is found out that Pooja is alive, and she was the one who had burned down the mental institution because "she didn't like it there". Rahul and Pooja run away from the cops and Pooja's dad who wants her back in mental hospital is trying to trace her. They roam the jungle and change places, but they are caught by the police in a town and at the climax Pooja snatches a gun from a police officer and shoots herself saying she doesn't want to go back to the mental hospital, she wants to be with Rahul. Her grandfather and Rahul helplessly watch her die.

Cast
 Pooja Bhatt as Pooja
 Rahul Roy as Rahul
 Pooja Bedi as Seema
 Avtar Gill as Pooja's Grandfather

Soundtrack

Music for Phir Teri Kahani Yaad Aayi was composed by Anu Malik while lyrics were penned by Qateel Shifai, Kaifi Azmi and Zameer Kazmi. The soundtrack consisting of 9 Tracks was released on Tips Music on 16 July 1993. The song "Tere Dar Par Sanam" was sung in both male and female version, were sung by Kumar Sanu and Sadhana Sargam. The soundtrack became popular, especially the tracks "Tere Dar Par Sanam" and "Dil Mein Sanam Ki Surat".

References

External links
 

1993 films
1990s Hindi-language films
Indian romantic drama films
Films directed by Mahesh Bhatt
Films scored by Anu Malik
Films about Bollywood
Indian television films